This article is about the particular significance of the year 1784 to Wales and its people.

Incumbents
Lord Lieutenant of Anglesey - Henry Paget (from 1 August) 
Lord Lieutenant of Brecknockshire and Monmouthshire – Charles Morgan of Dderw
Lord Lieutenant of Caernarvonshire - Thomas Bulkeley, 7th Viscount Bulkeley
Lord Lieutenant of Cardiganshire – Wilmot Vaughan, 1st Earl of Lisburne
Lord Lieutenant of Carmarthenshire – John Vaughan  
Lord Lieutenant of Denbighshire - Richard Myddelton  
Lord Lieutenant of Flintshire - Sir Roger Mostyn, 5th Baronet 
Lord Lieutenant of Glamorgan – John Stuart, Lord Mountstuart
Lord Lieutenant of Merionethshire - Sir Watkin Williams-Wynn, 4th Baronet
Lord Lieutenant of Montgomeryshire – George Herbert, 2nd Earl of Powis
Lord Lieutenant of Pembrokeshire – Sir Hugh Owen, 5th Baronet
Lord Lieutenant of Radnorshire – Edward Harley, 4th Earl of Oxford and Earl Mortimer

Bishop of Bangor – John Warren
Bishop of Llandaff – Richard Watson
Bishop of St Asaph – Jonathan Shipley
Bishop of St Davids – Edward Smallwell

Events
30 March - Lloyd Kenyon becomes Master of the Rolls.
7 May - Lady Henrietta Herbert, heiress of the Earl of Powis, marries Edward Clive, 2nd Baron Clive of Plassey.
14 May - Thomas James Bulkeley, 7th Viscount Bulkeley, is created Baron Bulkeley.
19 May - Henry Bayly Paget, 9th Baron Paget, is created Earl of Uxbridge.
23-25 July - Hester Thrale marries Gabriele Piozzi, much to the displeasure of Dr Samuel Johnson.
28 July - Lloyd Kenyon is raised to a baronetcy.
unknown date – Samuel Homfray and his brother quarrel with Anthony Bacon and take out a lease of one of the richest iron-ore deposits in the district (which develops into the Penydarren ironworks).

Arts and literature

New books
Richard Price – Importance of the American Revolution

Music
Edward Jones (Bardd y Brenin) – The Musical and Poetical Relicks of the Welsh Bards, including first publication of the harp air Dafydd y Garreg Wen

Births
17 January – Joseph Tregelles Price, ironmaster (died 1854)
25 May – John Frost, Chartist leader (died 1877)
16 December - Mary Jones, purchaser of an early Welsh-language Bible (died 1864)
date unknown 
Walter Coffin, coal-owner (died 1867)
Anthony Hill, ironmaster (died 1862)
David Owen (Dewi Wyn o Eifion), poet (died 1841)

Deaths
8 February – Christopher Bassett, Methodist exhorter, 30 (tuberculosis)
March – John Evans, Methodist exhorter, 47?
5 April – David Williams, minister and schoolmaster, 74?
December – John Richard, Calvinistic Methodist exhorter and hymn-writer, age unknown
date unknown 
John Hanbury III, ironmaster, 40?
, publisher, 52?

References

Wales
Wales